The 1928 United States Senate election in Maryland was held on November 5, 1928.

Incumbent Democratic Senator William Cabell Bruce ran for re-election to a second term in office, but was defeated by Republican former Governor Phillips Lee Goldsborough, who had been a failed candidate for Senate in 1916.

Democratic primary

Candidates
 William Cabell Bruce, incumbent Senator since 1923
 Virginia Peters-Parkhurst

Results

General election

Results

Results by county

Counties that flipped from Democrat to Republican
Anne Arundel
Baltimore (County)
Caroline
Carroll
Frederick
Kent
Montgomery
Prince George's
Somerset
Talbot
Washington
Wicomico
Worcester

Counties that flipped from Republican to Democrat
Queen Anne's

See also
1928 United States Senate elections
1928 United States elections

References

Notes

1929
Maryland
United States Senate